Jean-Pierre Ramis, born in 1943, is a French mathematician and a member of the French Academy of Sciences.

His work concerns the dynamic systems of complex field functions, discrete (difference equations and q-differences) and continuous (differential equations), in particular the notions of integrability (Morales-Ramis theory) and the Galois differential theory.

In 1982, Ramis received the Prix Paul Doistau–Émile Blutet.

Bibliography 

 Mathématiques tout-en-un pour la Licence, Dunod, 2013 (Préface d'Alain Connes)
 Mathématiques tout-en-un pour la Licence 2, Dunod, 2014
 Mathématiques tout-en-un pour la Licence 3, Dunod, 2015
 Cours de Mathématiques pures et appliquées, De Boeck, 2010

References

External links 

 Research Resource:
 (en) Mathematics Genealogy Project 
 Notice sur le site de l'Académie des sciences

1943 births
Living people
21st-century French mathematicians
20th-century French mathematicians
École Normale Supérieure alumni
Prix Paul Doistau–Émile Blutet laureates